Tetraglenes is a genus of beetles in the family Cerambycidae, containing the following species:

 Tetraglenes annamensis Breuning, 1943
 Tetraglenes bacillarius Lameere, 1893
 Tetraglenes breviceps Kolbe, 1894
 Tetraglenes bucculenta Gahan, 1895
 Tetraglenes carinithorax Breuning, 1942
 Tetraglenes ceylonensis Breuning, 1942
 Tetraglenes crassicornis Hintz, 1919
 Tetraglenes diuroides Ritsema, 1885
 Tetraglenes flavovittatus Breuning, 1948
 Tetraglenes fusiformis Pascoe, 1866
 Tetraglenes grossepunctata Breuning, 1942
 Tetraglenes hirticornis (Fabricius, 1798)
 Tetraglenes insignis Newman, 1842
 Tetraglenes intermedia Breuning, 1954
 Tetraglenes nimbae Lepesme, 1952
 Tetraglenes phantoma Gerstaecker, 1871
 Tetraglenes rufescens Pic, 1927
 Tetraglenes setosa Breuning, 1942
 Tetraglenes somaliensis Breuning, 1952

References

Agapanthiini